Resonance is the tendency of a physical system to oscillate at great amplitude at certain frequencies.

Resonance may also refer to:

Science

 Acoustic resonance, resonance of sound waves
 Electrical resonance, resonance of electrical potential or current
 Fano resonance
 Feshbach resonance
 Limbic resonance
 Magnetic resonance
 Mechanical resonance, resonance of physical motion
 Nuclear magnetic resonance (NMR)
 Orbital resonance, in celestial mechanics
 Planetary wave resonance, a mechanism hypothesised to explain extreme weather events
 Resonance (chemistry), the electronic delocalization in molecules often represented via a combination of related Lewis structures
 Resonance fluorescence
 Resonances in scattering from potentials
 Resonance (journal), an Indian journal of education
 Resonance (particle physics), of an isolated particle capable of decay that decays spontaneously
 Shape resonance
 Sympathetic resonance

Music
 Resonance FM, a London-based community radio station run by the London Musicians Collective
 Resonance, the magazine of the London Musicians Collective
 Resonance, the magazine for players of the resophonic guitar
 Pierre Bachelet (1944–2005), artist known for the 1973 hit "O.K. Chicago"
 Resonance, composition by Liviu Marinescu
 Resonance, a program presented by the Adelaide Guitar Festival

Albums
 Resonance (Anathema album), a 2001 compilation album by British rock band Anathema
 Resonance Vol. 2, 2002
 Resonance (Antigama album), 2007
 Resonance (Joe Pass album), 2000
 Resonance (Jordan Rudess album), 1999
 Resonance (Mad at Gravity album), 2002
 Resonance (Madras String Quartet album), 2000
 Resonance, a two-part studio album by South Korean boy group NCT, under the NCT 2020 project
 Resonance Pt. 1, 2020
 Resonance Pt. 2, 2020

Songs
 "Resonance" (T.M.Revolution song), a 2008 song by T.M.Revolution
 "Resonance" (LuvBug song), a song by LuvBug
 "Resonance", a song from the Jordan Rudess album Resonance
 "Resonance", a song by NCT, under the NCT 2020 project
 Resonance, a song by HOME

Other uses
 Resonance (game), an adventure game published by Wadjet Eye Games
 "Resonance" (Warehouse 13), a 2009 episode of Warehouse 13
 Resonate (company), an Internet technology company
 Ganying, the Chinese theory of Resonance

See also
 Sonorant, a class of sounds in phonetics, sometimes called resonants